AtmosFear is a  drop tower located in Liseberg amusement park in Gothenburg, Sweden, and is the third tallest drop tower in Europe, after Highlander at Hansa Park and Scream at Heide Park.

History
In 1990, Liseberg built a  observation tower named Lisebergstornet (The Liseberg Tower). After twenty years of operation, Liseberg closed the attraction and began to renovate the tower in May 2010. The tower became the main structure for AtmosFear which opened as the tallest drop tower in Europe in April 2011.

Ride

After boarding the gondola, riders await in suspense as the catch mechanism lowers and hooks onto the gondola. Red warning lights begin to flash in the station area and the gondola is slowly hoisted skywards, with riders being subjected to a light spray of mist upon leaving the station structure.

After a slow ascent to the summit of the tower, riders are presented with views over Liseberg and the surrounding Gothenburg. After several seconds, the catch mechanism releases the gondola.

References
 Atmosfear, Liseberg

External links

 Drawings of Lisebergstornet at Skyscraper Page
 Lisebergstornet at Emporis
 

Drop tower rides
Amusement rides manufactured by Intamin
Amusement rides introduced in 2011
Towers completed in 2011
Liseberg